Rhaisa Gomes Batista (born March 8, 1990) is a Brazilian model and actress.

Biography 
Rhaisa was born in Recife, Pernambuco, but she was raised in Lagoa de Itaenga, in the interior of the state, where her parents live. She is the daughter of a civil servant and a housewife.

Career 
She began working as a teenage model in Recife, and soon she moved to work in São Paulo. Rhaisa made several fashion shows, editorials, and fashion campaigns in Brazil and abroad.

In 2012, she was invited to participate in the series Louco por Elas and then she debuted in Lado a Lado, playing Esther Vieira.

Filmography

Television

Film

References

External links
 

1990 births
Living people
Actresses from Recife
People from Recife
Brazilian female models
Brazilian telenovela actresses
Brazilian television actresses
Brazilian film actresses